Biała Piska  (former) is a town in Pisz County, Warmian-Masurian Voivodeship, Poland, with 3,986 inhabitants as of December 2021.

Geography
Biała Piska is a recreation area in the Masurian Lake District, located in the eastern part of the Warmian-Masurian Voivodeship, in the historic region of Masuria, on the east coast of Śniardwy, the largest of the lakes. To the south is the Puszcza Piska, a heath with large forests.

History
First mentioned as "Gailen" in 1334, the town was established in 1428 as a German farming village "Auf der Gaylen", in the monastic state of the Teutonic Knights. The Polish name of the settlement was Biała, meaning white. It was later Germanized to the name Bialla. Since 1466 it was under Polish suzerainty as a fief. In 1480 a church was built in the town. In the 16th century it grew rapidly in the Duchy of Prussia (vassal state of Poland), as trading increased between the Germans and Poles. In the middle of the century there were 38 farms and three mills. In 1645 it gained the right to have four markets per year. In 1656 it was pillaged by the Tatars, plundered and burned, and many residents died or were displaced.

It became part of the Kingdom of Prussia in 1701. From 1709-1711, there was a plague epidemic, which killed 315 residents. Nonetheless, the economic development continued apace, and the settlement received its town charter in 1722 from King Frederick William I of Prussia. A royal resettlement program brought many new residents, especially artisans. Between 1756 and 1763, a new church, a 1.65 ha marketplace, a network of roads, and a new town hall were built. During the Seven Years' War, the town was occupied by Russian troops from 1758-1762. Afterwards, it became a garrison city for Prussian troops from 1764 to 1800.

In the Napoleonic Wars, Russia made the town a headquarters for their troops in 1807 for nine days, followed by French and Polish troops, demanding payment of their stationing costs, as well as bringing new sicknesses, which killed many residents. After the defeat of the French, the Prussians reorganized their territorial administration, and in 1818 the town was assigned to Landkreis Johannisburg in the Gumbinnen region. It became part of the German Empire in 1871 during the unification of Germany. In 1885 the railway line from Pisz to Ełk arrived in the town. At that time, the population was about 1,700, of whom 700 were Polish-speaking.

During World War I, combat between German and Russian troops happened near the town, which was entered by Russian troops and plundered. Under the terms of the Treaty of Versailles, the residents of the town voted 100% to remain in Weimar Germany. In 1927 and 1928, a new courthouse and waterworks were built. In 1938, as part of an extensive action of Germanization and elimination of names of Polish origin, the Nazis renamed the town to Gehlenburg. In the 1939 census, there were 2,823 residents. It was nearly abandoned in the face of the advancing Soviet front, which captured the city on January 23, 1945. A few weeks later, power was transferred to the new Polish administration. The town became part of Poland under the Potsdam Agreement. The historic name Biała was restored and the adjective Piska was added, after the nearby town of Pisz, to distinguish the town from many other Polish settlements of the same name.

Transport
National road nr. 58 and voivodeship road nr. 667 pass through the town.

Sport
Znicz Biała Piska is a semi-professional football club with a very good reputation and notable successes for a club and town of its size.

Gallery

References

External links

 Official website

Cities and towns in Warmian-Masurian Voivodeship
Pisz County